Ory is a surname, and may refer to;

Birgitt Ory (born 1964), German diplomat
Carlos Edmundo de Ory (1923–2010), born in the Spanish city of Cadiz, Spanish avant-garde poet
Csaba Őry (born 1952), Hungarian politician and Member of the European Parliament with the Hungarian Civic Party
Gisèle Ory (born 1956), Swiss politician from the Canton of Neuchâtel
Kid Ory (1886–1973), Edward "Kid" Ory - American jazz trombonist and bandleader
Matthieu Ory (born 1492), French Dominican theologian and Inquisitor
Meghan Ory (born 1982), Canadian television and film actress
Michel Ory (born 1966), Swiss amateur astronomer
Pascal Ory (born 1948), French historian
Teresa Hurtado de Ory (born 1983), Spanish actress

See also
 Ory (disambiguation)
 Fritz d'Orey, Brazilian race car driver
 Marcello d'Orey, Portuguese rugby union player and lawyer

Surnames of French origin